Marcelo Adrián Gómez (born 8 December 1970) is an Argentine football manager and former player who played as a defensive midfielder.

Gómez is best known for his seven-year period (1990–1997) in Vélez Sársfield, where he played 189 games (4 goals) and won 8 titles.

Club career
Gómez was formed in Vélez Sársfield's youth divisions. He made his first team debut in 1990, and played with the team until 1997. During the period, he won 3 national league titles and 5 international competitions, in what became the team's most successful era. He was a starter in Vélez 2–0 victory over AC Milan for the 1994 Intercontinental Cup.

The midfielder joined River Plate in 1998. He played there briefly, and was then loaned to Gimnasia y Esgrima La Plata, Al-Ittihad (Saudi Arabia) and Huracán. His contract with River expired in 2003, and he ended his career playing in Costa Rica for LD Alajuelense.

International career
Gómez played one game with the Argentina national team, a 2–1 victory over Paraguay on June 14, 1995.

Coaching career
In 2010, Gómez worked as a scout for Vélez Sársfield.

On 2 January 2019, Gómez was appointed as manager of Godoy Cruz. After only six games, which he only won one of, he was fired on 24 February 2019.

Honours
Vélez Sársfield
Argentine Primera División (3): 1993 Clausura, 1995 Apertura, 1996 Clausura
Copa Libertadores (1): 1994
Interncontinental Cup (1): 1994
Supercopa Sudamericana (1): 1996
Copa Interamericana (1): 1994
Recopa Sudamericana (1): 1997

River Plate
Argentine Primera División (1): 1999 Apertura

Al-Ittihad
Saudi Premier League (1): 2000–01
Saudi Crown Prince Cup (1): 2000–01

L. D. Alajuelense
CONCACAF Champions' Cup (1): 2004

References

External links
 Argentine Primera statistics at Fútbol XXI  
 
 

Living people
1970 births
Footballers from Buenos Aires
Association football midfielders
Argentine footballers
Argentine expatriate footballers
Argentina international footballers
Argentine Primera División players
Club Atlético Vélez Sarsfield footballers
Club Atlético River Plate footballers
Club de Gimnasia y Esgrima La Plata footballers
Ittihad FC players
Club Atlético Huracán footballers
Liga FPD players
L.D. Alajuelense footballers
Expatriate footballers in Saudi Arabia
Expatriate footballers in Costa Rica
Saudi Professional League players
Godoy Cruz Antonio Tomba managers
Zamora F.C. managers